Gadê County is a county in the southeast of Qinghai Province, China, bordering Gansu to the east. It is under the administration of Golog Tibetan Autonomous Prefecture.

Administrative divisions
Gadê is divided into one town and six townships:

Kequ Town
Shanggongma Township
Xiagongma Township
Ganglong Township
Jiangqian Township
Xiazangke Township
Qingzhen Township

Climate

See also
 List of administrative divisions of Qinghai

References

County-level divisions of Qinghai
Golog Tibetan Autonomous Prefecture